Sandra Záhlavová was the defending champion, having won the event in 2012, but chose not to compete in 2013.

Wildcard Arantxa Rus won the title, defeating first seed Carina Witthöft in the final, 4–6, 6–2, 6–2.

Seeds

Main draw

Finals

Top half

Bottom half

References 
 Main draw

Tean International - Women's Singles
2013 Women's Singles
2013 in Dutch tennis